Let's Talk About Youth is a 1976 South Korean dramatic film.

Plot
When Sun-a becomes pregnant, she does not know who is the father of her unborn child, and asks Jeong-su to help her care for the baby.  She later finds out that Seok-ku is the father and abandons the child. Sun-a and Seok-ku decide to start a new life with the help of Jeong-su.

Cast
Kim Hee-ra
Choe Min-hui
Lee Deok-hwa
Park Am
Jeon Shook
Kim Ung
Kim Ji-young

External links 

1970s Korean-language films
1976 films

South Korean drama films